Hypericum acostanum is a species of flowering plant in the family Hypericaceae. It is endemic to Ecuador, where it is known only from Loja.

References

acostanum
Endemic flora of Ecuador
Taxonomy articles created by Polbot